Callender Peak is a precipitous, mainly ice-covered subsidiary peak on the Mount Murphy massif, located  east-northeast of the summit of Mount Murphy, on Walgreen Coast, Marie Byrd Land. It was first mapped by the United States Geological Survey from air photos obtained in January 1947 by U.S. Navy Operation Highjump, and named by the Advisory Committee on Antarctic Names after Lieutenant Gordon W. Callender (CEC), U.S. Navy, officer in charge of Byrd Station in 1966.

References 

Mountains of Marie Byrd Land